Republic of Kampuchea may refer to:

 Khmer Republic
 Democratic Kampuchea
 People's Republic of Kampuchea

See also 
 State of Cambodia (disambiguation)